Falinski is a surname. Notable people with the surname include:

Ben Falinski, British singer and member of the band Ivyrise
Jason Falinski (born 1970), Australian politician

See also
Fafinski
Feliński